Thomas Singleton (1552 – 29 November 1614) was an English clergyman and academic.

Singleton studied at Clare Hall, Cambridge for four years, before moving to Brasenose College, Oxford in 1573. He graduated B.A. 1574, M.A. 1578, B.D. 1586, D.D. 1597. He became a Fellow of Brasenose in 1576, and was Proctor in 1585–86. 
He was Principal of Brasenose College from 1595 until his death in 1614.
He was twice Vice-Chancellor at the University of Oxford during 1598–9 and 1611–14.

In the church, Singleton was a canon of St Paul's Cathedral from 1597, and of Hereford Cathedral from 1614.

Singleton died on 29 November 1614, and was buried in St Mary's Church.

References

1552 births
1614 deaths
Alumni of Clare College, Cambridge
Alumni of Brasenose College, Oxford
Fellows of Brasenose College, Oxford
Principals of Brasenose College, Oxford
Vice-Chancellors of the University of Oxford